Canoeing at the 2011 All-Africa Games in Maputo, Mozambique was held between September 6–11, 2011.

Medal summary

Slalom

Sprint
Men

Women

Medals table

References

External links 
 "Results from the african games in Maputo", International canoe federation, 09-09-11

2011 All-Africa Games
2011
All-Africa Games